Hollywood Houselift with Jeff Lewis is an American reality television series hosted by Jeff Lewis. It premiered on Amazon Freevee on June 10, 2022.

Summary
The series follows interior designer Jeff Lewis and his assistant Shane Douglas as they work on home remodeling projects for Hollywood celebrities.

The show is executive produced by Lewis, Allison Grodner and Rich Meehan, with Billy Taylor as the showrunner. It is Lewis's first TV series since Flipping Out, which ran on Bravo from 2007 to 2018.

Cast
 Jeff Lewis
 Shane Douglas
 Anthony Anderson
 Wilmer Valderrama
 Fortune Feimster
 Evan Ross
 Ashlee Simpson
 Mira Sorvino
 Lamorne Morris
 Melissa Rivers
 Roselyn Sanchez

Episodes

Release
The trailer for the series was released on May 2, 2022. The first three episodes of the series premiered on Amazon Freevee on June 10, 2022, with a new episode made available every Friday through July 29, 2022.

Reception
Nina Metz of the Chicago Tribune rated the series 3 out of 4 stars and called it "fascinating," writing, "No matter the personal style - austere, expensive minimalism or over-the-top everything - all of it is ostentatious and fascinating and says so much about how the 1% spend their wealth. This is the primary appeal of 'Hollywood Houselift with Jeff Lewis.'" Rachel Shatto of The Advocate called the series "a welcome return to form" for Lewis, adding that it "functions more like a sequel to Bravo's Flipping Out than a reboot."

References

External links 
 

English-language television shows
2022 American television series debuts
2020s American reality television series
Home renovation television series